Rapt or RAPT may refer to:

Acronyms
 Rehabilitation for Addicted Prisoners Trust (RAPt), a charity which helps people with drug and alcohol dependence move towards, achieve and maintain drug and crime-free lives
 Reverse Address and Port Translation, a variation of Network Address Translation in computing
 Retractable Amphibious Pontoon Technology, a retractable pontoon system for the float plane industry being developed by Tigerfish Aviation
 RAPT1 or mTOR, the mammalian target of rapamycin protein
 RATP Group (Régie Autonome des Transports Parisiens), a public transport company based in Paris, France

Films

 Rapt (film), a 2009 French dramatic film directed by Lucas Belvaux
 Rapt: la séparation des races, a 1934 film directed by Dimitri Kirsanoff

Other uses
 "Rapt. Dept.", a 2005 single/EP from Yourcodenameis:milo
 Rapt or Raptus, a king of the Hasdingi Vandals

See also
 Raptio, Latin term referring to the large scale abduction of women
 Raptor (disambiguation)
 Rapture (disambiguation)
 Raptus (disambiguation)